Imperio Carcione (born 4 March 1982) is an Italian footballer who most recently played for Paganese in Serie C.

References

External links
 

1982 births
People from Cassino
Living people
Italian footballers
Association football midfielders
Serie B players
Serie C players
A.S.D. Cassino Calcio 1924 players
U.S. Salernitana 1919 players
Benevento Calcio players
L'Aquila Calcio 1927 players
A.C. Perugia Calcio players
S.S. Arezzo players
Paganese Calcio 1926 players
U.S. Catanzaro 1929 players
Footballers from Lazio
Sportspeople from the Province of Frosinone